The 2001 World Table Tennis Championships women's singles was the 46th edition of the women's singles championship.
Wang Nan defeated Lin Ling in the final by three sets to one, to win the title.

Results

See also
 List of World Table Tennis Championships medalists

References

-
World